Aethes subcitreoflava is a species of moth of the family Tortricidae. It is found in China (Gansu, Inner Mongolia, Jilin, Shanxi).

The ground colour of the forewings is yellow, finely reticulated (a net-like pattern) with yellowish brown throughout. The hindwings are grey.

Etymology
The species name is derived from the Latin prefix sub-, and the name of the species Aethes citreoflava and refers to the similarity of these two species.

References

subcitreoflava
Moths described in 2013
Moths of Asia